Aurantibacter aestuarii is a Gram-negative, aerobic and rod-shaped bacterium from the genus of Aurantibacter which has been isolated from seawater from the Gwangyang Bay.

References 

Flavobacteria
Bacteria described in 2014